Frank Collins (16 December 1910 – 25 January 2001) was an Australian cricketer. He played fifteen first-class matches for South Australia between 1934 and 1936.

See also
 List of South Australian representative cricketers

References

External links
 

1910 births
2001 deaths
Australian cricketers
South Australia cricketers
Cricketers from Adelaide
People from Queenstown, South Australia